The Hohenstein Institute (also known as Hohenstein Group) is an international research and testing company that provides neutral testing, certification and development of textiles and textile-related products. 

Founded in 1946, Hohenstein is based in Boennigheim, Germany.

In 1946, Hohenstein was founded as a textile school in 1946 by Prof. Dr.-Ing. Otto Mecheels,  His son, Prof. Dr. Jürgen Mecheels, developed Hohenstein into an international, inter-disciplinary research and service company and co-founded the OEKO-TEX Association. 

In 1995. Dr. Stefan Mecheels  became the director.  Hohenstein expanded its laboratory network, doubled in size and launched the Hohenstein Academy.

External links
Hohenstein Global Headquarters in Germany
OEKO-TEX® Association
UV STANDARD 801
RAL Laundry Association

References

Textile companies of Germany
Companies based in Baden-Württemberg
Research institutes in Germany
International textile organizations